The Fayetteville Arsenal in Fayetteville, North Carolina was built in 1838 because during the War of 1812 the United States government realized that the existing distribution of weapons and ammunition factories was not adequate for the defense of the country. A program was begun to provide more Federal arsenals which would be distributed so that no area of the country would be too far away from an arms depot.  Bladen County Representative James McKay introduced House Resolution #374 for inclusion of an arsenal at Fayetteville.

The cornerstone for the Arsenal was laid April 9, 1838. It was constructed of brick and stone and at each of the four corners of its massive walls was an octagonal tower. Entry into the Arsenal was controlled by use of massive iron gates. Workshops, quarters and other buildings in the Arsenal were constructed of brick and wood.

Civil War
Even before North Carolina formally seceded from the Union, Governor Ellis commissioned Warren Winslow to bring about the peaceful, if possible, surrender of the Arsenal at Fayetteville. General Walker Draughon, then in command of the North Carolina Militia, was given the order to take possession of the Arsenal, then occupied by a Federal garrison consisting of Battery D, 2nd U.S. Artillery.

He mobilized the Fayetteville Independent Light Infantry (FILI) (the oldest private military organization in the State, having been organized in 1793) under the command of Major Wright Huske, and the LaFayette Light Infantry, commanded by Capt. Joseph B. Starr. Other troops were used as well, and the total number of troops present on April 22, 1861 was approximately 500.

After the Confederate troops had been inspected by the representative of the Federal forces, Lt. Julius de Lagnel, he decided that resistance was fruitless and surrendered the arsenal without incident.  It was vacated by Federal forces on April 27, 1861.

Major Wright Huske of the FILI "took up, in obedience to orders, its permanent quarters there for protection of important and valuable property."

After the fall of the Arsenal at Harpers Ferry to Confederate forces in April of 1861, plans were made to relocate the rifle making machinery from that location to new workshops at the Fayetteville Arsenal. Arms-making machinery from Harpers Ferry was installed in October 1861, and the arsenal became a major supplier of small arms to the Confederate troops. The principal armament was known as the Fayetteville Rifle. At its peak, the arsenal produced 500 rifles per month and various numbers of other larger ordnance, cartridges, swords, and bayonets. Over one hundred workmen from the Harpers Ferry Arsenal had relocated with their families to Fayetteville. In the middle years of the war, young ladies of the area were employed in the making of cartridges and as clerks.

In 1865, as Union Major General William T. Sherman led his forces on the Carolinas Campaign it became apparent to the Confederate commander, Colonel Childs, that Fayetteville was a major target. When Sherman reached Columbia, South Carolina, Col. Childs ordered the construction of earthworks for the defense of the Fayetteville area. Remnants of these earthworks can be seen on the grounds of the Veterans Administration Hospital on Ramsey Street.

Resistance was given but the battered and weary Confederate forces were overwhelmed by the tremendous numbers and firepower of the Union troops. Sherman entered Fayetteville on March 11, 1865 and took possession of the Arsenal (which had been stripped of its arms, munitions, and useful machinery by the retreating Confederates). The Harpers Ferry rifle manufacturing machinery was said to have been hidden in the Egypt, NC coal mines. Continuing his scorched earth policy, Sherman ordered the Arsenal razed to the ground. His soldiers used railroad rails as battering rams to knock the building down then set the remains on fire. As the fire raged, some remaining artillery shells exploded and completed the devastation.

Today
Very little remains at the actual site today due to the construction of a central business district loop road through the area in 1988.  There is one remaining partial frame outbuilding and a historical marker, and other remnants of the U.S. Arsenal can be seen on display at the Museum of the Cape Fear Historical Complex. The foundations of the buildings that were located along the back wall of the arsenal, including the foundations of two of the towers, can be seen in the park located behind the Museum of the Cape Fear.

The Arsenal site was listed on the National Register of Historic Places in 1983.

References
Walking tour brochure of Fayetteville, NC
http://www.fili1793.com The Fayetteville Independent Light Infantry website

It is noteworthy that both Federal officers present with Battery D, Captain Samuel Anderson and Lieutenant Julius de Lagnel, resigned their commissions and joined the armed forces of the Confederate States of America in April and May 1861, respectively.

Buildings and structures in Fayetteville, North Carolina
United States Army arsenals
North Carolina in the American Civil War
Archaeological sites on the National Register of Historic Places in North Carolina
National Register of Historic Places in Cumberland County, North Carolina